The 2004-05 season of the Divizia A Feminin was the 15th season of Romania's premier women's football league. Top four places qualified in the Championship play-off.

Championship play-off 

 CFF Clujana  (champion 2005–06 UEFA Women's Cup Qualifying round)
 Pandurii Lignitul Târgu Jiu
 Motorul Oradea
 Şantierul Naval Constanţa

Final

References

Rom
Fem
Romanian Superliga (women's football) seasons